The sixth and final season of the American neo-Western television series Justified premiered on January 20, 2015, on FX, and concluded on April 14, 2015, consisting of 13 episodes. The series was developed by Graham Yost based on Elmore Leonard's novels Pronto and Riding the Rap and his short story "Fire in the Hole". Its main character is Raylan Givens, a deputy U.S. Marshal. Timothy Olyphant portrays Givens, a tough federal lawman, enforcing his own brand of justice in his Kentucky hometown. The series is set in the city of Lexington, Kentucky, and the hill country of eastern Kentucky, specifically in and around Harlan. The sixth season was released on DVD and Blu-ray in region 1 on June 2, 2015.

Cast and characters

Main
 Timothy Olyphant as Deputy U.S. Marshal Raylan Givens
 Nick Searcy as Chief Deputy U.S. Marshal Art Mullen
 Jere Burns as Wynn Duffy
 Joelle Carter as Ava Crowder
 Jacob Pitts as Deputy U.S. Marshal Tim Gutterson
 Erica Tazel as Deputy U.S. Marshal Rachel Brooks
 Walton Goggins as Boyd Crowder

Recurring

Guest

Production
On January 14, 2014, it was announced that Justified was renewed for a sixth season, which is the final season based on a decision by executive producer Graham Yost and lead actor Timothy Olyphant.

Filming for the season began in September 2014.  Also in September 2014, Sam Elliott and Garret Dillahunt (who previously starred with Olyphant on Deadwood), were cast in recurring roles for the final season. In November 2014, Jeff Fahey was cast in a recurring role. In January 2015, it was announced that Jonathan Tucker signed on to play Boon for the final five episodes.

Episodes

Reception

Critical response
The sixth season has received critical acclaim from television critics, and has a Metacritic rating of 89 out of 100 based on 11 reviews. It currently holds a 100% "Certified Fresh" rating on Rotten Tomatoes with an average rating of 9 out of 10 based on 25 reviews with a critics consensus stating, "Justified returns to form for its endgame, rebounding with crisp storytelling and colorful characters who never take themselves too seriously."

Accolades
For the 5th Critics' Choice Television Awards, it was nominated for Best Drama Series and received four acting nominations–Timothy Olyphant for Best Actor in a Drama Series, Walton Goggins for Best Supporting Actor in a Drama Series, Joelle Carter for Best Supporting Actress in a Drama Series, and Sam Elliott won for Best Guest Performer in a Drama Series. For the 31st TCA Awards, the series was nominated for Outstanding Achievement in Drama.

References

External links
 

06
2015 American television seasons